
Gmina Przystajń is a rural gmina (administrative district) in Kłobuck County, Silesian Voivodeship, in southern Poland.

The gmina contains part of the protected area called Upper Liswarta Forests Landscape Park.

Villages
Gmina Przystajń contains the villages and settlements of Antonów, Bagna, Bór Zajaciński, Brzeziny, Dąbrowa, Galińskie, Górki, Kamińsko, Kluczno, Kostrzyna, Ługi-Radły, Michalinów, Mrówczak, Nowa Kuźnica, Podłęże Szlacheckie, Przystajń, Siekierowizna, Stany, Stara Kuźnica, Węzina, Wilcza Góra and Wrzosy.

Neighbouring gminas
Gmina Przystajń is bordered by the gminas of Ciasna, Herby, Krzepice, Olesno, Panki and Wręczyca Wielka.

References

Przystajn
Kłobuck County